Mor Severios (27 March 1851 – 11 June 1927) was a Metropolitan for the Knanaya. He was born in Travancore now a part of the state of Kerala to Kasiso and Kunjachi Philippose Edavazhickal.

References

External links
Mor Severios
Selection of brief biographies of Knanaya

1851 births
1927 deaths
Malayali people
Knanaya people